This is a list of notable current and former nightclubs in New York City.

A 2015 survey of former nightclubs in the city identified 10 most historic ones, starting with the Cotton Club, active from 1923–1936.

 The Beatrice Inn (2006–2009)
 Bungalow 8 (2001–2009)
 Café Society (1938–1948)
 CBGB (1973–2006)
 Chateau Moderne (1930s)
 Club Cumming
 Connie's Inn
 Copacabana (1940–1992)
 Cotton Club (1923–1936)
 Danceteria (1979–1986)
 El Morocco
 Electric Circus
 Fez
 Half Note Club
 Industry
 La Martinique
 Latin Quarter
 Limelight (1983–1990s)
 The Loft (New York City)
 Nell's (1986–2004)
 Palladium (1976–1995)
 The Q
 Riobamba
 The Saint
 Stork Club
 Studio 54 (1977–1991)
 Therapy
 The Tunnel (1986–2001)
 The Blue Angel (New York nightclub)
 The Village Gate
 The World
 Xenon

See also

 Architecture of New York City
 List of buildings, sites, and monuments in New York City
 Music of New York City

References

Nightclubs in New York City
Nightclubs in New York City

Nightclubs